"Dumpa mig" is the debut single by Swedish singer Veronica Maggio, from her debut studio album Vatten och bröd. It was released in Sweden as a digital download on 20 March 2006. The song peaked at number 14 on the Swedish Singles Chart.

Track listing
Digital download
 "Dumpa mig" (Radio Version) – 3:38
 "Dumpa mig" (Extended Version) – 4:21

Charts

Release history

References

Veronica Maggio songs
2006 debut singles
2006 songs
Swedish-language songs